The Natural History of Fear is a Big Finish Productions audio drama based on the long-running British science fiction television series Doctor Who. It is part of the "Divergent Universe" saga which continued until The Next Life.

Plot
In Light City, a prole can remember details from the Information which have not yet been shown, about the three characters the Doctor, Charley and C'rizz, and is brought before the Editor for daring to ask Questions, a terrible Thought Crime.

Cast
Big Finish has intentionally left the cast ambiguous by not listing character names aside the actors' as the story utilizes the voice cast in an interesting way. This was done for added suspense. 
Paul McGann
India Fisher
Conrad Westmaas
Sean Carlsen
Jane Hills
Geoffrey Searle
Alison Sterling
Ben Summers
Wink Taylor

External links
Big Finish Productions - The Natural History of Fear

2004 audio plays
Eighth Doctor audio plays